Happily is a 2021 American comedy thriller film written and directed by BenDavid Grabinski, in his directorial debut. It stars Joel McHale, Kerry Bishé, Stephen Root,  Natalie Morales, Paul Scheer and Natalie Zea.

It was released on March 19, 2021 by Saban Films.

Premise
Tom and Janet's friends are jealous of their lustful relationship. When a visit from a mysterious stranger leads to a dead body, they begin to question the loyalty of their so-called friends.

Cast

Production
In February, 2019 it was announced that Joel McHale, Kerry Bishé, Stephen Root, Natalie Zea,  Paul Scheer, Natalie Morales, Jon Daly, Kirby Howell-Baptiste, Charlyne Yi, Breckin Meyer, Shannon Woodward, Brea Grant and Al Madrigal had been cast in the film, with BenDavid Grabinski directing from his screenplay. Nancy Leopardi, Ross Kohn, Jack Black and Spencer Berman would produce the film under their Indy Entertainment and Electric Dynamite companies, while Kyle Newman and Chuckie Duff would be executive producers under his Common Wealth Media banner.

Principal photography began in Los Angeles in February 2019.

Release
It was scheduled to have its world premiere at the Tribeca Film Festival on April 18, 2020. However, the festival was postponed due to the COVID-19 pandemic. In November 2020, Saban Films acquired distribution rights to the film. It was released on March 19, 2021.

Reception
Review aggregator Rotten Tomatoes gives the film a 70% approval rating based on 50 reviews, with an average rating of 6.60/10. The website's critics consensus reads: "Happily struggles to fully realize its ambitions, but at its best, this intermittently intriguing drama makes pointed -- and frequently funny -- observations about modern relationships." According to Metacritic, which sampled 11 critics and calculated a weighted average score of 56 out of 100, the film received "mixed or average reviews".

References

External links
 

2021 black comedy films
2021 thriller films
2020s comedy thriller films
American black comedy films
American comedy thriller films
Films about vacationing
Films postponed due to the COVID-19 pandemic
Films scored by Joseph Trapanese
Films shot in Los Angeles
Saban Films films
2020s English-language films
2020s American films